{{Infobox television
| image                = Roger Moore The Alaskans 1959.JPG
| caption              = Roger Moore on the set of The Alaskans, 1959
| alt_name             =
| genre                = AdventureWestern
| creator              = 
| director             = Leslie GoodwinsRichard GordonCharles F. HaasJesse HibbsLeslie H. MartinsonWilliam A. SeiterRichard SinclairRobert SparrHerbert L. StrockJacques TourneurGeorge Waggner
| developer            = 
| presenter            = 
| starring             = Roger MooreDorothy ProvineJeff YorkRay Danton
| voices               = 
| narrated             = 
| theme_music_composer = "Gold Fever" byMack David and Jerry Livingston<ref name =Theme>[http://www.classicthemes.com/50sTVThemes/themePages/alaskans.html Classic TV Themes entry for The Alaskans]</ref>
| opentheme            = 
| endtheme             = 
| composer             = Max Steiner
| country              = United States
| language             = English
| num_seasons          = 1
| num_episodes         = 37
| list_episodes        = 
| executive_producer   = William T. Orr
| producer             = Barry IngsterHarry TatelmanCharles TrapnellOren W. Haglund (Production manager)Gordon Bau (make-up)
| editor               = David WagesRobert B. Warwick
| location             = California
| camera               = 
| runtime              = 60 minutes
| company              = Warner Bros. Television
| network              = ABC
| picture_format       = 1.33:1 monochrome
| audio_format         = monoaural
| first_aired          = 
| last_aired           = 
| related              = Appears to haveshared scripts butnot characters orsettings with:MaverickBroncoCheyenneSugarfoot 
}}The Alaskans is a 1959–1960 ABC/Warner Bros. western television series set during the late 1890s in the port of Skagway, Alaska. The show features Roger Moore as "Silky Harris" and Jeff York as "Reno McKee", a pair of adventurers intent on swindling travelers bound for the Yukon Territories during the height of the Klondike Gold Rush.  Their plans are inevitably complicated by the presence of singer "Rocky Shaw" (Dorothy Provine), "an entertainer with a taste for the finer things in life".

The show was the first regular work on American television for the British actor Roger Moore.

Relationship with MaverickThe Alaskans is closely related to the ABC/WB series Maverick through broadcast and production.  Maverick was the most prominent of ABC's Sunday night of western dramas.  For the 1959–60 season, Sundays began with Colt .45 and Maverick, then John Russell's Lawman and Nick Adams' The Rebel, and concluded with The Alaskans.

The same year that The Alaskans was canceled, James Garner left Maverick. Moore became, under protest, Garner's replacement, playing Bret Maverick's cousin Beau Maverick in the fourth season of Maverick.

Because of the 1960 Writers Guild of America strike as well as an ongoing Warner Bros. policy to save money on writers, The Alaskans inherited a certain amount of scripted material from Maverick.  Moore bristled at the lack of originality in scripts:  "An old Bronco script would interchange with an Alaskans or Maverick.  In some cases, even the dialogue stayed unchanged." In 2007, Moore noted, "Quite often I realized that we were filming Maverick scripts, with the names changed." This made it simple for Jack L. Warner to envision Moore as Maverick, since Moore had literally delivered Garner's dialogue while reshooting the same scripts with different names and locales.

Since the show has not been available to home audiences for more than forty years, independent verification of either claim is difficult. However, The Alaskans may have drawn from other series as well. One viewer has detailed which specific Maverick, Sugarfoot and Cheyenne episodes spawned clones on The Alaskans. Cannibalizing scripts was standard operating procedure at Warner Bros. television. Their first big hit in the detective genre, 77 Sunset Strip, was copied in analogous series such as Bourbon Street Beat, Surfside 6, and Hawaiian Eye'', with only the locations changed – Los Angeles to New Orleans, Miami Beach, and Hawaii. The basic characters were identical with only the character parts which spoke in jargon being re-written e.g. horse racing tout to jazz slang. This pre-dated the troubles with the Writers Guild.

Roger Moore's views
For Roger Moore, the series was memorable for being "my most appalling television series ever".  In particular, he found that attempting to recreate Alaskan exteriors on a studio backlot in California made for disagreeably hot work days.  The show also caused some marital strife for the actor when he had to admit to wife Dorothy Squires that he had fallen in love with co-star Dorothy Provine.

Cast
Roger Moore as Silky Harris
Dorothy Provine as Rocky Shaw
Jeff York as Reno McKee
Ray Danton as Nifty Cronin
John Dehner in two episodes each as Cornish and Soapy Smith

Guest stars

Julie Adams
Claude Akins
Don Beddoe
Jacqueline Beer
Steve Brodie
Walter Burke
Frank Cady
Robert Colbert
Tris Coffin
Jerome Cowan
John Dehner
Frank DeKova
Troy Donahue
Don Dubbins
Frank Ferguson
Arthur Franz
Leo Gordon
Alan Hale, Jr.
Myron Healey
John Hoyt
I. Stanford Jolley
Allyn Joslyn
Andrea King
Werner Klemperer
Ruta Lee
Andra Martin
Diane McBain
Robert McQueeney
Mort Mills

Gerald Mohr
Simon Oakland
Joan O'Brien
Jerry Paris
Emory Parnell
Lee Patterson
Larry Pennell
Louis Quinn
Gilman Rankin
Rex Reason
Mike Road
Madlyn Rhue
Bing Russell
Walter Sande
Dick Sargent
Pippa Scott
Fay Spain
Karen Steele
Warren Stevens
Harold J. Stone
Ray Teal
Lee Van Cleef
Gary Vinson
Richard Webb
James Westerfield
Peter Whitney
Marie Windsor
Efrem Zimbalist, Jr.

Episodes

References

External links 
 

American Broadcasting Company original programming
Television series by Warner Bros. Television Studios
1959 American television series debuts
1960 American television series endings
Television series set in the 1890s
Television shows set in Alaska
1950s Western (genre) television series
1960s Western (genre) television series
Black-and-white American television shows
Klondike Gold Rush in fiction